Scratch Track is as an acoustic hip-hop soul band that formed in Tennessee in 2000. The group is composed of vocalist/beatboxer DJ Lee and guitarist Jason Hamlin. Scratch Track is currently based out of Kansas City, MO. Their most recent release is a full length called Brake Lights in 2011.

History
Scratch Track started as a trio in 2000, when Jason Hamlin, DJ Lee, and Will Gray met at Union University, in Jackson, Tennessee. In 2002, the trio moved to Martha's Vineyard, MA and recorded their first studio album The Simple which was released in 2003.

In late 2004, Scratch Track released an LP entitled Unreleased Sessions which included hit songs for the band like "Come One Come All" and "1972".  In 2005, they showcased for the NACA Upper Midwest Regional Conference garnering them a fall tour of over 70 college campuses. However, a few weeks before going on tour, Will Gray parted ways with Scratch Track for personal reasons.

The two remaining band members, Jason and DJ, were left with 70 shows to play in a span of 90 days. Zeth McReynolds from Kansas City joined up with Scratch Track and helped them remain a trio for this tour.  Around this time, Scratch Track's beatboxing and guitar were featured on the hit song from Trick Daddy, Sugar on My Tongue.  After successfully completing the tour, they were invited to the 2006 NACA National Conference and were nominated for the 2006 “Brightest Rising Star” award in the Campus Activities Magazine.

In 2006, they continued to tour college campuses as a trio with Brent Windler joining them for their spring tour.  A tour which had Scratch Track headlining small venues and open as a special guest to the band O.A.R., which was inspired by their appearance on Sony PlayStation’s MLB 06: The Show for the song Hands Together. Scratch Track also had their song “Don’t Go” featured on the hit TV show CSI:NY episode “Oedipus Hex”. In late 2006, the band released an EP entitled "Interpretation of the Afterwards". This really showcased how Scratch Track has evolved into a truly original sound and solidified them as a dynamic duo consisting of Jason Hamlin and DJ Lee.

At the start of 2007, the band continued to tour colleges and In September 2007, Scratch Track headed to Europe to jam for the troops thanks to the Armed Forces Entertainment. Once back in the United States, Scratch Track went to work on their new album The Legend Of Wild Bill.  The Legend of Wild Bill was released in March 2008 and showed a much more aggressive sound sonically for the band.

Band members
 David "DJ" Lee - vocals, beatboxing
 Jason Hamlin - guitar, vocals

External links

Musical groups established in 2000
American hip hop groups
Union University alumni